Douglas Tait, Taitt or Tate may refer to:

Douglas Tait (illustrator), Canadian children's book illustrator
Douglas Tait (actor), American actor, creature performer, stuntman and producer
Doug Taitt, baseball player 
Doug Tate, a character in the 1990 film Alice, played by William Hurt

See also 
Robin Douglas Tait, New Zealand discus thrower